Kenichi Sonei (  1910 – 7 December 1946) was an Imperial Japanese Army captain during the Pacific War. Following the Japanese conquest and occupation of the Dutch East Indies (present-day Indonesia), he was the commander of the 10th Battalion prisoner of war camp from September 1942 to February 1944 and of the Tjideng internment camp from April 1944 to June 1945.

Sonei developed a reputation for being an extremely unstable and violent man who made life hell for the internees. For example, he had all camp prisoners, including the sick, line up every day and let them stand for hours in the full sun. Knowing camp rations were meager, Sonei had his dogs fed in front of the camp gate. In full view of the hungry prisoners, he personally served both animals fried eggs with meat, prepared by his cook. Sonei would beat women and shave their heads. Additionally, he was considered "moonsick" as his most brutal acts of violence often took place at full moon.

At the end of World War II in Asia, Sonei was arrested and sentenced to death by a Temporary Court-Martial on 2 September 1946. The sentence was carried out by a Dutch firing squad in December of the same year, after a request for clemency to the acting governor-general of the Dutch East Indies, Hubertus van Mook, was rejected. Van Mook's wife had been one of Sonei's prisoners in Tjideng.

References

1910 births
1946 deaths
20th-century Japanese criminals
Imperial Japanese Army personnel of World War II
Japanese people executed abroad
Japanese people executed for war crimes
People executed by the Netherlands by firing squad
People from Wakayama Prefecture